Ribaue is a town in northern Mozambique in the Ribáuè District.

Ribaue lies immediately southeast of Mount Ribáuè.

Transport 

It is served by a station on the narrow gauge Nacala Railway system.

See also 
 Railway stations in Mozambique

References 

Populated places in Nampula Province